State Road 340 (SR 340) is a State Road in the west-central part of the U.S. state of Indiana. Both ends of SR 340 are at intersections with U.S. Highway 40 (US 40), with the western end in Cloverland and the eastern end in Brazil. SR 340 was originally introduced in the late 1930s or early 1940s routed north of its modern routing. The road was moved to its modern routing in the 1960s.

Route description
SR 340 begins an intersection with US 40 in the unincorporated community of Cloverland. The road heads east concurrent with the National Road, passing through Cloverland and Billtown, before entering the town of Brazil. In Brazil SR 340 ends at an intersection with US 40 and the National Road continues east on US 40. The entire route of SR 340 is along the old National Road and closely parallels US 40 to the north. The highest traffic count for SR 340 in 2016 was west of its intersection with Waterworks Road in Brazil, where 3,684 vehicles travel the highway on average each day. The lowest traffic count during 2016 was at the western end of SR 340, where 1,379 vehicles travel the highway on average each day.

History
SR 340 was first commissioned in the state of Indiana between 1939 and 1941, running between Cloverland and Brazil. This route was north of the modern routing and north of Williamstown, now Billtown. Between 1962 and 1963 the US 40 designation was moved to a new four-lane highway, between Cloverland and Brazil, and the SR 340 designation was moved south to its modern route, to replace the US 40 designation on the National Road.

Major intersections

References

External links

340
Transportation in Clay County, Indiana
U.S. Route 40